Country Classic was a Quarter Horse gelding that competed and won in halter, showmanship, cutting, working cowhorse, barrel racing, stake race, hunt seat equitation, pole bending, hunter under saddle, trail, western pleasure, horsemanship, roping – both heading and heeling, and western riding. He won 98 all-around titles, a reserve world championship in stake race, six open and youth AQHA Superiors awards, and placed 15 times in the AQAH Youth World Show Top Ten. He died in April 1986.

Country Classic was inducted into the AQHA Hall of Fame in 2001.

Notes

References

External links
 Country Classic Pedigree at All Breed Pedigree
 Country Classic at Quarter Horse Directory
 Country Classic at Quarter Horse Legends

Cutting horses
American Quarter Horse show horses
1969 animal births
1986 animal deaths
AQHA Hall of Fame (horses)